Lecanora polytropa, commonly known as the granite-speck rim lichen, is a species of saxicolous lichen in the family Parmeliaceae. A small, inconspicuous species that grows in the cracks of rock surfaces, it has a cosmopolitan distribution and has been recorded on all continents, including Antarctica.

Taxonomy
It was originally described by German botanist Jakob Friedrich Ehrhart in 1796 as a species of Verrucaria. Gottlob Ludwig Rabenhorst transferred it to the genus Lecanora in 1845.

It is commonly known as the granite-speck rim lichen.

Description

Lecanora polytropa has a scanty thallus, which sometimes resembles tiny pale yellowish areoles. The tiny, flat apothecia typically measure 0.3–0.9 mm in diameter and may be scattered or clustered together. They have a waxy texture and are yellow to pale orange, lacking pruina. The margins of the apothecia are smooth, not prominent, and tend to be lighter in colour than the central disc. Ascospores are ellipsoid and measure 8–15 by 5–7 μm.

Habitat and distribution
Lecanora polytropa grows on siliceous rock, particularly granite. It prefers locations with full sun exposure. It is common on exposed granite boulders and outcrops throughout its range, although it may readily be missed due to its small size. The lichen has a cosmopolitan distribution, and is known from all continents. It is found in the maritime and continental Antarctic, including the Antarctic Peninsula, Queen Mary Land, and Victoria Land.

In a study of the community structure of saxicolous lichens found on rock faces within a  radius of the Mount Tokachi volcano in Japan, researchers found that Lecanora polytropa thrived in the volcanic environment (close to the active fumarole) that was intolerable for many other species. Its tiny thalli can insert into the small depressions and cracks on the rock, helping it gain a foothold and begin surface colonization even when faced with the weathering associated with high winds and storms. Lecanora polytropa is also involved in the succession of lichens that appear on gravestones, and tends to maintain its presence long after its initial colonization.

Species interactions
Lecanora polytropa is a known host to the lichenicolous fungus species Carbonea aggregantula, Carbonea supersparsa, Carbonea vitellinaria, Cercidospora epipolytropa, Endococcus propinquus, Lichenoconium lecanorae, Muellerella erratica, Muellerella lichenicola, Muellerella pygmaea var. athallina and Stigmidium squamariae.

Similar species
Lecanora polytropa may be confused with L. fuscobrunnea, which has larger apothecia (up to 1.6 mm wide) that are partially blackened to completely black, and may have a rudimentary stipe. In L. polytropa, the apothecia  are always sessile and not blackened.

See also
List of Lecanora species

References

polytropa
Lichen species
Lichens described in 1796
Lichens of Africa
Lichens of the Antarctic
Lichens of Asia
Lichens of Europe
Lichens of North America
Lichens of South America
Taxa named by Jakob Friedrich Ehrhart